"The Immortals" is a song by American rock band Kings of Leon. It is the sixth track on their fifth studio album Come Around Sundown. The song was originally slated to be released as a single on 21 March 2011. However, it was eventually scrapped. A video of the song was used in an advertisement to promote the 2011 NCAA Men's Division I Basketball Tournament and its brand new 68-team field, and was used from March 4–17.

Concept
Caleb Followill, lead singer of Kings of Leon, who wrote the song along with the other Followills, says "The Immortals": "In a way, I kind of wanted it to be something that I could say to my children. It really says it all in one chorus. Here it is: go out and be who it is you wanna be and at the end of the day, before you've gone, make sure you've loved."

Remix
In late 2011, Norwegian band Röyksopp remixed the song which then leaked online and was not physically released.

Credits and personnel
Kings Of Leon
Caleb Followill - Vocals and guitar
Matthew Followill - Lead guitar
Jared Followill - Bass guitar
Nathan Followill - Drums
Producers – Angelo Petraglia, Jacquire King
Lyrics – Caleb Followill, Nathan Followill, Jared Followill, Matthew Followill
Label – RCA Records

Chart performance

References

Kings of Leon songs
2010 songs
2011 singles
Songs written by Matthew Followill
Songs written by Jared Followill
Songs written by Nathan Followill
Songs written by Caleb Followill
RCA Records singles
Song recordings produced by Jacquire King